Tsui Chi Ho (born 17 February 1990) is a Hong Kong sprinter. He competed in the 4 × 100 m relay event at the 2012 Summer Olympics.

Tsui Chi Ho competed in the  2008 Asian Junior Athletics Championships in Jakarta, winning bronze in both the 100m sprint and 4 × 100 m relay.

Tsui Chi Ho is a member of the Hong Kong sprint team that won gold at men's 4 × 100 metres relay at the 2013 Asian Athletics Championships in Pune, India in July 2013. Hong Kong's quartet of Tang Yik Chun, Lai Chun Ho, Ng Ka Fung and Tsui Chi Ho won the relay in 38.94 seconds, ahead of second-placed Japan (39.11 secs) and China (39.17 secs).

In October 2013, Tsui Chi Ho won the Hong Kong Athletics League by winning the 100m final with a time of 10.66 seconds.

In October 2014, at the 2014 Asian Games, Tsui Chi Ho anchored the sprint team that set a seasonal best of 38.98 seconds to capture the bronze medal, behind China and Japan. This is Hong Kong's first Asian Games bronze medal in track and field since the 1954 Asian Games in Manila, when Stephen Xavier came third in the men’s 200 metres.

References

External links 

Diamond League Athlete profile

1990 births
Living people
Hong Kong male sprinters
Olympic athletes of Hong Kong
Athletes (track and field) at the 2012 Summer Olympics
Asian Games medalists in athletics (track and field)
Athletes (track and field) at the 2010 Asian Games
Athletes (track and field) at the 2014 Asian Games
Athletes (track and field) at the 2018 Asian Games
Asian Games bronze medalists for Hong Kong
Medalists at the 2014 Asian Games
21st-century Hong Kong people